The Naica Mine of the Mexican state of Chihuahua, is a lead, zinc and silver  mine. Located in Naica in the municipality of Saucillo, the Naica Mine is owned by Industrias Peñoles, the world's largest silver producer. Peñoles announced in October 2015 that it was indefinitely suspending operations due to uncontrollable flooding at the Naica Mine.

The peak underground air temperature was 58° C (136° F) with 100% relative humidity, which rapidly exposed the visitors to hyperthermia hazard and caused breathing difficulties. Because of the heat, unprotected researchers could only stay up to 10 minutes inside the cave. Longer visits required the use of a special suit fitted with a cooling system (ice reserve in a backpack with cooled water recirculating in polymer tubes installed over all the body surface) and delivering fresh air for an easier breathing. The visits were limited to about half an hour, the time needed to melt the ice reserves.

Cave of the Crystals

 
The chamber contains giant selenite crystals, some of the largest natural crystals ever found.
The selenite crystals were formed by hydrothermal fluids heated by the magma chamber below. The cavern was discovered while the miners were drilling through a newly drained area. The caves are closed to the public, and remain closed after a worker tried to enter the cave to steal some of the selenite, only to suffocate and die in the cave's humid and inhospitable atmosphere. 

Reports in 2017 stated that scientists had found "long-dormant microbes" in the crystals and removed them for further research. The cave was closed in 2015 and some of the chambers were allowed to flood again to continue the process of crystal growth. If the mining company decides to open another entrance, researchers might again enter to continue their work, according to a February 2019 report.

The Cave of Swords
It also containing gypsum crystals but each "only" about a meter long, due to the fact that these crystals are younger and had been growing for much less time by the time they were discovered in 1910.

Gallery

References

External links
 

Naica mine at Peñoles
Naica Mine at Mindat.org
Naica Project, comprehensive website on the Crystal Caves with geology, history, photos and videos

 Let's Talk about Crystallization in the Naica Mine, at Wikijunior books for children.

Caves of Mexico
Lead mines in Mexico
Zinc mines in Mexico
Silver mines in Mexico
Underground mines in Mexico
Geography of Chihuahua (state)
Landforms of Chihuahua (state)

pl:Kryształowa Jaskinia w Naica